Woden High School is a public high school located in Woden, Texas (USA) and classified as a 2A school by the UIL. It is part of the Woden Independent School District located in south central Nacogdoches County. Woden High School also serves students from the neighboring Etoile Independent School District, which does not have its own high school. In 2015, the school was rated "Met Standard" by the Texas Education Agency.

Athletics
The Woden Eagles compete in these sports - 

Baseball
Basketball
Cross Country
Golf
Softball
Tennis
Track and Field

(All sports are co-educational except for softball (girls only) and baseball (boys only)).  Woden does not play football.

References

External links
Woden ISD

Schools in Nacogdoches County, Texas
Public high schools in Texas